The original Frita is a Cuban dish with a seasoned ground beef and pork patty (sometimes mixed with chorizo) on Cuban bread topped with shoestring potatoes. Variations also include lettuce, onions, and a spiced ketchup sauce.  A similar dish on Cuban bread is called pan con bistec (bistec de palomilla) topped with the shoestring potatoes.  This type of burger is found mainly in South Florida.

This burger is usually washed down with a batido de trigo, a Cuban puffed wheat milk shake.
One of many burgers featured in Hamburgers and Fries by John T. Edge. Frita along with Loco Moco, Jucy Lucy, green chile burgers at Bobcat Bite, and the fried onion burgers of El Reno, Oklahoma are considered some of the unique regional takes on the hamburger in the United States.

References 
Frita Cuban hamburger recipe as made in Cuba 

Cuban cuisine
Culture of Miami
The Cuban Frita was originally made in Ciego de Avila, Camaguey by Luis Obregon. He created it and sold it on a roadside stand during the Machado era. When the patties became popular, the stand was shut down and the Frita was adopted by a local Hotel. More details to come